The following is a list of notable deaths in December 2003.

Entries for each day are listed alphabetically by surname. A typical entry lists information in the following sequence:
 Name, age, country of citizenship at birth, subsequent country of citizenship (if applicable), reason for notability, cause of death (if known), and reference.

December 2003

1
Hamza Alvi, 82, Pakistani-British sociologist and activist (Campaign Against Racial Discrimination).
Barbara Galdonik, 69, American baseball player (AAGPBL).
Clark Kerr, 92, first Chancellor of the University of California, Berkeley (1952–58) and President of the University of California (1958–67), complications from a fall.
Eugenio Monti, 75, Italian bobsledder (six Olympic bobsledding medals: 1956 two silver, 1964 two bronze, 1968 two gold).
Carl Schenkel, 55, Swiss film director.

2
Ruth Nanda Anshen, 103, American philosopher, author and editor.
John Brimhall, 75, American composer, music arranger and author of more than 500 music instruction books.
Alan Davidson, 79, British food writer and diplomat.
Fernando Di Leo, 71, Italian film director and script writer.
Ignaz Kiechle, 73, German politician and minister for agriculture (1983–93).
Rudolph A. Peterson, 98, American banker.
Jim Sheehan, 90, American baseball player (New York Giants).

3
Dulce Chacón, 49, Spanish poet, novelist and playwright, Pancreatic cancer.
Jim Conway, 78, Australian rules football player and coach.
Jay Difani, 80, American baseball player (Washington Senators).
Ellen Drew, 88, American film actress, Liver ailment.
David Hemmings, 62, British actor and director, heart attack.
John Randal McDonald, 81, American architect.

4
Jace Bugg, 27, American professional golfer (Nationwide Tour, Canadian Tour).
John H. Hannah Jr., 64, American judge (U.S. District Judge of the U.S. District Court for the Eastern District of Texas), heart attack.
Iggy Katona, 87, American stock car racer.
Jonathan Luna, 38, United States Assistant Attorney.
David Vaughan, 59, English psychedelic artist.
Jacques Viau, 84, Canadian lawyer.

5
Paul Busby, 85, American baseball player (Philadelphia Phillies).
Felix Kaspar, 88, Austrian figure skater (bronze medal in men's singles figure skating at the 1936 Winter Olympics).
Jack Keller, 61, American poker player.
Antony Rowe, 79, English rower.
Bert Templeton, 63, Scottish-born Canadian ice hockey coach, kidney cancer.
Julius Waring Walker Jr., 76, American diplomat, United States Ambassador to Upper Volta.

6
Haddis Alemayehu, 93, Ethiopian Foreign Minister and novelist.
Carlos Manuel Arana Osorio, 85, Guatemalan military ruler, President of Guatemala who murdered thousands of adversaries.
John Bingham, 61, British classical pianist.
Frank J. Breth, 66, American Marine Corps brigadier general.
John Ronald Henderson, 83, British army officer.
Hans Hotter, 84, German operatic bass-baritone.
Barry Long, 77, Australian spiritual teacher and writer.
Jerry Tuite, 36, American wrestler, heart attack.

7
Roland Asselin, 86, Canadian fencer (1948 Olympic fencing, 1952 Olympic fencing, 1956 Olympic fencing).
Barta Barri, 92, Hungarian-Spanish film actor.
Mary Alice Barton, 86, American quilter,  quilt historian, and philanthropist.
Johnny Bulla, 89, American golfer.
Carl F. H. Henry, 90, American Evangelical theologian and founder of Christianity Today magazine.
Azie Taylor Morton, 67, American public servant (Treasurer of the United States), complications from a stroke.

8
Lewis M. Allen, 81, American film and Broadway producer, nominated for seven Tony Awards and won three.
Margaret Jean Anderson, 84, Canadian businesswoman and senator (representing Northumberland--Miramichi, New Brunswick).
Nikolay Binev, 69, Bulgarian theater and film actor.
Nelson Bobb, 79, American professional basketball player (Temple University, Philadelphia Warriors).
Rubén González, 84, Cuban pianist.
Chuck Noe, 79, American basketball coach (VMI, Virginia Tech, South Carolina, VCU) and broadcaster.
Sir Stephen Tumim, 73, British lawyer, Her Majesty's Chief Inspector of Prisons.
Francine Weisweiller, 87, French socialite and patron of Jean Cocteau.

9
Carol M. Bundy, 61, American serial killer, heart failure.
Blackie Ko, 50, Taiwanese film director, stuntman, singer and actor, blood poisoning.
Keith McCreary, 63, Canadian hockey player, cancer.
Margaret Quass, 77, British educationalist.
Gladys Shelley, 91, American lyricist and composer.
Paul Simon, 75, American author and politician, United States Senator from Illinois from 1985 to 1997.
Norm Sloan, 77, American college basketball player and coach (The Citadel, University of Florida, North Carolina State).
David P. Weikart, 72, American psychologist and child education expert, his findings are widely cited to promote Head Start.

10
Robert Bartley, 66, American newspaper editor (The Wall Street Journal editorial page), won a Pulitzer Prize.
Sir Oswald Cheung, 81, Hong Kong lawyer and politician.
Ettore Perazzoli, 29, Italian free software developer.
Sir John Watts, 73, British army general.
Don Wheeler, 81, American baseball player (Chicago White Sox).

11
Shah Ahmad Noorani, 77, Pakistani Islamic scholar, mystic, philosopher, revivalist and an ultra–conservative politician.
Malcolm Clarke, 60, British composer.
Ahmadou Kourouma, 76, Ivorian novelist.
Ram Kishore Shukla, 80, Indian politician.
John W. Sidgmore, 52, former head of Worldcom and UUNet, acute pancreatitis.

12
Heydar Aliyev, 80, Azerbaijani politician, served as the third president of Azerbaijan.
Ross Belsher, 70, Canadian politician (member of Parliament of Canada for Fraser Valley East, British Columbia).
Michael Casson, 78, British potter.
Joseph Anthony Ferrario, 77, American Roman Catholic prelate, Bishop of Honolulu (1982–1993).
Earl Gillespie, 81, American sportscaster, voice of the Milwaukee Braves.
Keiko, 27, orca of Reino Aventura and Free Willy fame, pneumonia.
Fadwa Toukan, 86, Palestinian poet.

13
Elizabeth Bates, 56, American professor of cognitive science, pioneering work in child language acquisition, pancreatic cancer.
Elizabeth Bunce, 88, American geophysicist, oceanographer (Woods Hole Oceanographic Institution) and author.
Māris Čaklais, 63, Latvian poet and writer.
Mollie Hardwick, 87, British writer.
William V. Roth, Jr., 82, American lawyer and politician United States Senator from Delaware from 1971 to 2001.
Webster Young, 71, American jazz trumpeter (Miles Davis, John Coltrane, Dizzy Gillespie).

14
Jeanne Crain, 78, American actress, heart attack.
Blas Ople, 75, Filipino journalist and politician.
François Rauber, 70, French pianist, composer, arranger and conductor.
Frank Sheeran, 83, American labor union leader and mobster, "The Irishman"

15
Abram Salmon Benenson, 89, American medical doctor and author on preventive medicine, epidemiology and communicable diseases.
Johnny Cunningham, 46, British folk musician.
George Fisher, 80, American political cartoonist.
Jack Gregory, 80, British athlete.
Garvin Hamner, 79, American baseball player (Philadelphia Phillies).
David S. Lewis, 86, American aerospace engineer.
Keith Magnuson, 56, Canadian ice hockey player (Chicago Black Hawks), road accident.
Sergio Vergara, 76, Chilean fencer (men's individual épée fencing at the 1964 Summer Olympics).
Dora Wasserman, 84, Russian-Canadian actress, playwright, theater director.

16
Willis Adcock, 81, Canadian-American inventor, physicist, electrical engineer and educator.
Glynn Boyd Harte, 55, English painter, illustrator and author.
Liuboslav Hutsaliuk, 80, Ukrainian-American painter, graphic artist, and cartoonist.
Madlyn Rhue, 68, American actress, pneumonia.
Robert Stanfield, 89, Canadian politician (member of Parliament representing Colchester—Hants and Halifax, Nova Scotia).
Gary Stewart, 58, American country music singer: "She's Actin' Single (I'm Drinkin' Doubles)", suicide.

17
Bonnie Baker, 85, Canadian baseball player (AAGPBL)
Ed Devereaux, 78, Australian actor.
Otto Graham, 82, American professional football (Cleveland Browns) and member of the Pro Football Hall of Fame, heart aneurysm.
David Smith, 69, English cricketer.
Alan Tilvern, 86, English actor and voice artist (Bhowani Junction, The Lord of the Rings (1978 film), Who Framed Roger Rabbit).
Lloyd Weier, 65, Australian rugby league player.
Jim Wolf, 51, American professional football player (Prairie View A&M, Pittsburgh Steelers, Kansas City Chiefs).
Gordon Wood, 89, American high school football coach, retired in 1985 as the winningest high school football coach in the nation.

18
Daniel Amneus, 84, American literary scholar.
Charles Berlitz, 90, American linguist, spoke 32 languages, wrote world-wide language curriculum.
Jack Dormand, Baron Dormand of Easington, 84, British politician.
Susan Travers, 94, only English woman to serve in the French Foreign Legion.
Richard Wahlstrom, 72, American Olympic rower (bronze medal in men's coxed four at the 1952 Summer Olympics).

19
Peter Carter-Ruck, 89, British libel lawyer.
Roger Conant, 94, American herpetologist.
Hope Lange, 72, American actress, ischemic colitis.
Heinz Marquardt, 80, German Luftwaffe fighter ace during World War II and recipient of the Knight's Cross of the Iron Cross.
Carmen Mauro, 77, American baseball player (Chicago Cubs, Brooklyn Dodgers, Washington Senators, Philadelphia Athletics).
Les Tremayne, 90, English radio, film and television actor, heart failure.

20
Denis Barry, 74, American chess player and official, president of the United States Chess Federation.
Grigore Grigoriu, 62, Moldovan actor, car accident.
Alan Magee, 84, American World War II airman, survived 22,000 ft. fall.
Gil Reece, 61, Welsh  footballer.

21
Prince Alfonso of Hohenlohe-Langenburg, 79, Spanish businessman and playboy.
Antony Allen, 90, English cricketer.
Gawaine Baillie, 69, British amateur racing driver, engineer, industrialist, stamp collector and estate owner.
Robert Boutilier, 50, Canadian biologist and professor (Royal Society of Canada).
M. J. Gopalan, 94, Indian sportsman.
G. V. Iyer, 86, Indian film director and actor.
Wanda Włodarczyk, 78, Polish Olympic fencer (women's foil at the 1952 Summer Olympics).

22
Mikhail Borodulin, 36, Kazakhstani ice hockey player (men's ice hockey at the 1998 Winter Olympics).
Wah Chang, 86, Chinese-American designer, sculptor, and artist.
Dave Dudley, 75, American country music singer, heart attack.
Rose Hill, 89, English actress and operatic soprano.
Chandu Sarwate, 83, Indian cricketer and fingerprint expert.
Doris Shadbolt, 85, Canadian art curator and writer.
Alvan Williams, 71, British footballer and manager.

23
Charlie Bowles, 86, American baseball player (Philadelphia Athletics).
Kriangsak Chamanan, 86, Prime minister of Thailand.
Don Lamond, 83, American jazz drummer, brain tumor.
John Newlove, 65, Canadian poet and editor.
John Sanders, 70, British organist, pneumonia.
Basil Wells, 91, American writer.

24
David Hobman, 76, English social activist.
Herman Keiser, 89, American golfer.
Eugene Maltsev, 74, Soviet Russian painter.
Nigel Moore, 73, English cricketer.
Lois Barclay Murphy, 101, American developmental psychologist, congestive heart failure.
Noel Toy, 84, American burlesque performer.

25
Frédéric Berthet, 49, French writer.
Charles Concordia, 95, American electrical engineer and computer pioneer.
Foggy Lyttle, 59, Irish guitarist.
Nicola Paone, 88, American singer, songwriter, and restaurateur.
George Zambelli, 79, American businessman, long-time president and manager of Zambelli Fireworks.

26
Hugh Bean, 74, English violinist, teacher and leader of the Philharmonia Orchestra.
Gale Bishop, 81, American professional basketball player (Washington State, Philadelphia Warriors).
Redfern Froggatt, 79, English footballer.
Phil Goldman, 39, American engineer and entrepreneur, heart failure.
Yoshio Shirai, 80, first Japanese world boxing champion, pneumonia.

27
Pete Alvarado, 83, American animation and comic book artist (Disney Studios, Warner Bros. Animation, Western Publishing).
Sir Alan Bates, 69, British actor (The Fixer, Zorba the Greek, Georgy Girl, Women in Love), pancreatic cancer.
Enric Bernat, 80, Spanish businessman, founder of Chupa Chups.
Iván Calderón, 41, Puerto Rican baseball player (Seattle Mariners, Chicago White Sox, Montreal Expos), homicide by gunshot.
Gerhard Doerfer, 83, German philologist.
Vestal Goodman, 74, American Southern Gospel singer, complications from influenza.
Nagavally R. S. Kurup, 86, Indian writer and broadcaster.
Richie Niemiera, 82, American professional basketball player and coach (Notre Dame, Fort Wayne Pistons, Anderson Packers).
Patrick J. Reynolds, 83, Irish politician.
Polly Rosenbaum, 104, American politician and teacher.
Ying Ruocheng, 74, Chinese actor (Marco Polo, The Last Emperor, Little Buddha), director, translator and China's vice-minister of culture.
Alex Sakula, 86, British respiratory physician.
Vincent D. Smith, 74, American artist, painter, printmaker, lymphoma complicated by pneumonia.

28
Lawrence Bogorad, 82, Soviet-American botanist, a pioneer in photosynthesis and chloroplast biology.
Benjamin Thurman Hacker, 68, first American Naval Flight Officer to achieve the "Flag" rank.
Frank Parr, 85, British chess player.
Thomas Pearsall, 83, Australian politician.
John Terraine, 82, British military historian.

29
Charles E. Beatley, 87, American politician, mayor of Alexandria, Virginia.
Dickie Davis, 37, English cricketer, brain cancer.
Earl Hindman, 61, American actor (Home Improvement, The Parallax View, Taps), lung cancer.
Dinsdale Landen, 71, British actor, pneumonia.
Don Lawrence, 75, British comic book artist.
Bob Monkhouse, 75, British comedian and game show host, prostate cancer.
Ersa Siregar, 52, Indonesian reporter and journalist, shot dead in a shootout between TNI and GAM.
Michel Zanoli, 35, Dutch road cyclist (men's individual road race, men's team time trial at 1988 Summer Olympics).

30
David Bale, 62, South African businessman and activist, husband of Gloria Steinem.
Vladimir Bogomolov, 77, Soviet writer (The Moment of Truth, 1973).
John Gregory Dunne, 71, American novelist and screenwriter, heart attack.
Anita Mui, 40, Hong Kong pop queen.
Samuel M. Nabrit, 98, American marine biologist and educator, president of Texas Southern University.
Hukwe Zawose, 65, Tanzanian musician.

31
Renata Babak, 69, Ukrainian-American mezzo-soprano who defected from the Bolshoi Opera in 1973.
Sophie Daumier, 69, French actress, comedian, Huntington's disease.
Sir David Scott-Barrett, 81, British army general.
Arthur R. von Hippel, 105, German-American scientist and MIT professor who made critical contributions to the development of radar.
Valentin Vdovichenko, 75, Soviet fencer (men's team épée fencing at the 1956 Summer Olympics).
Sieglinde Wagner, 82, Austrian operatic contralto.
Max West, 87, American baseball player (Boston Bees/Braves, Cincinnati Reds, Pittsburgh Pirates).

References 

2003-12
 12